Asian Business Aviation Association or AsBAA, is a non-profit corporation based in Hong Kong. The Association represents 152 members as of August 2022. It co-hosts the annual Asia-based ABACE show together with NBAA in the month of April at the Shanghai Hongqiao Airport, China. AsBAA also hosts an annual awards & charity gala event in association with Orbis Charity, typically held every November. The Awards is called the "Icons of Aviation" Asia Awards and recognizes through an independent voting process the best of what the Business Aviation Industry represents and has to offer.

Platinum Members 

Here is the current list of Platinum Members:

Aircraft Maintenance and Engineering Corporation, Beijing 
Bombardier
China Aviation Rescue & Emergency
Duncan Aviation
Gulfstream
Hong Kong Business Aviation Center
Sino Jet
TAG Aviation Asia Limited
UAS International Trip Support

References

External links 
AsBAA.org

Aviation in Asia